Massi–Kuwait Cycling Project is a Kuwaiti UCI Continental cycling team established in 2015.

Team roster

Major wins
2015
 National Road Race championships, Salman Alsaffar
 National Time Trial championships, Salman Alsaffar
Stage 3 Tour of Al Zubarah, Eugen Wacker
2016
 National Time Trial championships, Khaled Alkhalifah

References

UCI Continental Teams (Asia)
Cycling teams established in 2015
2015 establishments in Kuwait
Cycling teams based in Kuwait